CIEL-FM-4 is a French-language Canadian radio station located in Trois-Pistoles, Quebec. The station airs a mix of locally produced programming and simulcasting of CIEL-FM in Rivière-du-Loup.

Owned and operated by Radio CJFP (1986) ltée (part of the Groupe Radio Simard), it broadcasts on 93.9 MHz with an effective radiated power of 229 watts using an omnidirectional antenna (class A1). The station has an adult contemporary format under the CIEL branding.

History
The station's roots go back to 1970, when CIEL's AM predecessor CJFP was authorized by the Canadian Radio-television and Telecommunications Commission to add some programming from a studio in Trois-Pistoles to the main AM signal originating in Rivière-du-Loup. Because the AM signal failed to adequately serve Trois-Pistoles at nighttime, however, an FM rebroadcaster with the call sign CJTF-FM was added at Trois-Pistoles in 1985.

This transmitter was deleted from CJFP's license in 1997, becoming a separate station with a license commitment to air at least 10 hours per week of distinct programming at Trois-Pistoles. The station adopted its current call sign in 2001, at the same time as CJFP became CIEL-FM.

Notes

External links
 CIEL
 

Iel
Iel
Iel
Iel
Radio stations established in 1985
1985 establishments in Quebec